Joan Sebastián Jaramillo Herrera (born 14 April 1994) is a Colombian footballer.

Career

FK Iskra Borčice
He came to Iskra Borčice in Winter 2016, helping to achieve the highest football tier in Slovakia.

MŠK Žilina
On 27 May 2016, MŠK Žilina announced signing of Joan Herrera, on a half year contract with option to buy.

References

External links
 
 Futbalnet profile

1994 births
Living people
Colombian footballers
Colombian expatriate footballers
Association football defenders
Boyacá Chicó F.C. footballers
FK Iskra Borčice players
MŠK Žilina players
FK Senica players
Slovak Super Liga players
2. Liga (Slovakia) players
Footballers from Cali
Universitario Popayán footballers
Colombian expatriate sportspeople in Slovakia
Expatriate footballers in Slovakia